Tritonoturris secta is a species of sea snail, a marine gastropod mollusk in the family Raphitomidae.

Description
The length of the shell attains 20 mm, its diameter 6.9 mm.

Distribution
This marine species occurs in the South China Sea.

References

 Sowerby G.B. 1870 - Descriptions of forty-eight new species of shells. Proceedings of the Zoological Society of London 1870: 249–259, pls 21–22

External links
 
  Petit, R. E. (2009). George Brettingham Sowerby, I, II & III: their conchological publications and molluscan taxa. Zootaxa. 2189: 1–218
 Gastropods.com: Tritonoturris secta

secta
Gastropods described in 1870